USCGC Oliver Berry (WPC-1124) is the United States Coast Guard's 24th  cutter.  She was the first member of the three members of her class to be homeported in Honolulu, Hawaii.

Design

Like her sister ships, Oliver Berry is designed to perform search and rescue missions, port security, and the interception of smugglers. She is armed with a remotely controlled, gyrostabilized 25 mm autocannon, four crew-served M2 Browning machine guns, and light arms. She is equipped with a stern launching ramp, that allows her to launch or retrieve a water-jet propelled high-speed auxiliary boat, without first coming to a stop. Her high-speed boat has over-the-horizon capability, and is useful for inspecting other vessels, and deploying boarding parties. She is designed to support her crew of 24 for missions of up to five days, over distances of almost .

Operational history

Since this exceeded her maximum endurance she was refueled by other Coast Guard cutters. She was the first Sentinel-class cutter to travel that far from the United States's territorial waters, and the first Sentinel-class cutter to travel on a voyage of that length. It took eight days to travel from Hawaii to Majuro Atoll, in the Marshall Islands.

Her crew also engaged in various forms of cultural exchange with Marshall Islands citizens.

In July 2022, Oliver Berry provided assistance to Kiritimati Island, Kiribati, following their extreme drought.

Namesake

In 2010, Charles "Skip" W. Bowen, who was then the United States Coast Guard's most senior non-commissioned officer, proposed that all 58 cutters in the Sentinel class should be named after enlisted sailors in the Coast Guard, or one of its precursor services, who were recognized for their heroism.  In 2015 the Coast Guard announced that Oliver F. Berry, an aviation pioneer, who played a key role in shipping and using helicopters for a maritime search and rescue, would be the namesake of the 24th cutter.

References 

Sentinel-class cutters
Ships of the United States Coast Guard
2017 ships
Ships built in Lockport, Louisiana